Mouhamed Mbaye (born 13 October 1997) is a Senegalese professional footballer who plays as a goalkeeper for Portuguese club Académico Viseu.

Professional career
Mbaye made his professional debut with FC Porto B in a 3–1 LigaPro home win over Real S.C. on 1 November 2017.

On 10 November 2019, Mbaye was called up to FC Porto's first team for the first time, remaining unused in their 1–0 win away to city neighbours Boavista F.C. in the Primeira Liga; regular substitute goalkeeper Diogo Costa was playing in place of the injured Agustín Marchesín. He made his debut the following 20 July in a 6–1 home win for the already-crowned champions against Moreirense FC, as a 79th-minute substitute for Costa.

References

External links
 
 ZeroZero Profile

1999 births
Living people
Footballers from Dakar
Senegalese footballers
Senegal youth international footballers
FC Porto players
FC Porto B players
Académico de Viseu F.C. players
Aspire Academy (Senegal) players
Primeira Liga players
Liga Portugal 2 players
Association football goalkeepers
Senegalese expatriate footballers
Expatriate footballers in Portugal
Senegalese expatriate sportspeople in Portugal